Greyrock Mountain National Recreation Trail is a hiking trail in Roosevelt National Forest west of Laporte, Colorado.  The trail was constructed by the Civilian Conservation Corps in the 1930s and designated as a National Recreation Trail in 1979.

References

Protected areas of Larimer County, Colorado
National Recreation Trails in Colorado
Roosevelt National Forest
Civilian Conservation Corps in Colorado